Littoraria cingulata is a species of sea snail, a marine gastropod mollusk in the family Littorinidae, the winkles or periwinkles.

Description

Distribution

Littoraria cingulata is found in the tropical waters on the Indian Ocean.

References

Littorinidae
Gastropods described in 1846